Perhaps a Gentleman (Swedish: Kanske en gentleman) is a 1950 Swedish comedy film directed by Ragnar Frisk and starring John Elfström, Stig Järrel and Marianne Löfgren. It is a remake of a 1935 film of the same title, itself inspired by George Bernard Shaw's play Pygmalion. The film's sets were designed by the art director Bertil Duroj.

Synopsis
A director and an actor have a bet that they can turn a lowlife from the streets into a gentleman in just two months.

Cast
 John Elfström as 	Gurra Lind
 Stig Järrel as 	Stig Järrel
 Marianne Löfgren as 	Mrs. Haglund
 Gösta Cederlund as Eric Haglund
 Emy Hagman as 	Lisa
 Sten Gester as 	Björn
 Harriett Philipson as Vera
 Folke Hamrin as 	Bergstrand
 Lillie Wästfeldt as 	Malin
 Georg Skarstedt as 	Benster
 Dagmar Olsson as 	Sara
 Magnus Kesster as Loan Shark
 Helga Brofeldt as 	Ingeborg Hagström
 Arne Lindblad as 	Rydberg
 John Norrman as Berra

References

Bibliography 
 Krawc, Alfred. International Directory of Cinematographers, Set- and Costume Designers in Film: Denmark, Finland, Norway, Sweden (from the beginnings to 1984). Saur, 1986.
 Semenza, Greg M. Colón & Hasenfratz, Bob . The History of British Literature on Film, 1895-2015. Bloomsbury Publishing, 2015.

External links 
 

1950 films
Swedish comedy films
1950 comedy films
1950s Swedish-language films
Films directed by Ragnar Frisk
Swedish black-and-white films
Swedish films based on plays
Remakes of Swedish films
1950s Swedish films